Sylvester Churchill  (August 2, 1783 – December 7, 1862) was an American journalist and Regular Army officer.

Early life

Churchill was born in Woodstock, Vermont, the son of Joseph and Sarah (Cobb) Churchill. Educated in the schools of his home town, he became a journalist, and published, in 1808, a weekly newspaper, "The Vermont Republican." Churchill married Lucy Hunter (1786–1862), daughter of William and Mary (Newell) Hunter, August 30, 1812, in Windsor, Vermont.

Military career

At the outbreak of the War of 1812, he was appointed 1st lieutenant, 3rd U.S. Artillery on March 12, 1812, and was promoted to captain on August 15, 1813. He transferred to 1st U.S. Artillery on June 1, 1821, promoted to major, 3rd U.S. Artillery, on April 6, 1835, and colonel and Inspector General on June 25, 1841. He received the rank of brevet brigadier general, to date from February 23, 1847, in recognition of his services under General John E. Wool, at the Battle of Buena Vista during the Mexican–American War. At the beginning of the American Civil War, he had been Inspector General of the Regular Army for 20 years. He was retired September 25, 1861, due to ill health, and succeeded by Randolph B. Marcy.

Churchill died on December 7, 1862, in Washington, D.C. He was buried at Oak Hill Cemetery in Washington, D.C.

Churchill County, Nevada, established in 1861, was named after him, as was Fort Churchill, in Silver Springs, Nevada. The fort was built in 1861 and abandoned in 1869.

Churchill was a distant relative of Winston Churchill. The family resemblance evident in the portrait was noted by Winston Churchill and his contemporaries.

Notes

References
 Peck, Theodore S., compiler, Revised Roster of Vermont Volunteers and lists of Vermonters Who Served in the Army and Navy of the United States During the War of the Rebellion, 1861–66. Montpelier, VT.: Press of the Watchman Publishing Co., 1892, pp. 678, 737.
 Heitman, Francis B.. Historical Register and Dictionary of the United States Army, 1789–1903. Vol. 1. Washington, D.C.: U.S. Government Printing Office, 1903, p. 301.

Further reading
 Churchill, Franklin Hunter, Sketch of the Life of Bvt. Brig. Gen.Sylvester Churchill, Inspector General U.S. Army,  New York: McDonald, 1888.
 Henley, David C., Brigadier General Sylvester Churchill: The story of an American army hero ..., Fallon, NV: Lahontan Valley Printing, 1988.
 Lavender, David, Climax at Buena Vista: The American Campaigns in Northeastern Mexico 1846–1847,'' Philadelphia: J. B. Lippincott, 1956.

External links
 Vermont in the Civil War
 Fort Churchill State Historic Park, Nevada Division of State Parks.
 Churchill County, Nevada
 Steve Condarcure's New England Genealogy

1783 births
1861 deaths
People of Vermont in the American Civil War
United States Army personnel of the Mexican–American War
United States Army personnel of the War of 1812
Inspectors General of the United States Army
People from Woodstock, Vermont
United States Army colonels
Burials at Oak Hill Cemetery (Washington, D.C.)